There were 16 weightlifting events at the 2018 South American Games in Cochabamba, Bolivia. Eight for men and women. The events were held between May 28 and 31 at the Coliseo Grover Suárez.

Medal summary

Men

Women

Medal table
Ranking by Big (Total result) medals

References

External links
 2018 South American Games – Weightlifting 
 Results

2018 South American Games events
2018
South American Games